First Underground Nuclear Kitchen is a studio album by former Deep Purple, Black Sabbath and Trapeze vocalist/bassist Glenn Hughes. It is his twelfth solo studio album and was released in 2008 on Frontiers Records.

History
First Underground Nuclear Kitchen, the follow-up to 2006's Music for the Divine contains more funk rock–style music than his more hard rock–infused earlier records.

The album again features Red Hot Chili Peppers drummer Chad Smith on the entirety of the record and regular guitarist JJ Marsh on only two songs. Guitar player Luis Carlos Maldonado, best known for his work with John Waite, co-wrote five of the songs with Hughes. Other performances come from George Nastos on guitar and Anders Olinder and Ed Roth on keyboards.

First Underground Nuclear Kitchen was mixed by Jono Brown and Glenn Hughes.

A promotional video was shot for the song "Love Communion", the video was included on the European version of the album as an enhanced track.

First Underground Nuclear Kitchen entered the UK indie charts at No. 24

Track listing
 "Crave" – 4:20 (Hughes)
 "First Underground Nuclear Kitchen" – 3:46 (Hughes, Maldonado)
 "Satellite" – 4:34 (Hughes)
 "Love Communion" – 4:46 (Hughes, Maldonado)
 "We Shall Be Free" – 5:42 (Hughes, Maldonado)
 "Imperfection" – 4:50 (Hughes)
 "Never Say Never" – 5:08 (Hughes, Maldonado)
 "We Go 2 War" – 3:50 (Hughes, Maldonado)
 "Oil and Water" – 4:04 (Hughes)
 "Too Late to Save the World" – 6:22 (Hughes)
 "Where There´s a Will" – 4:27 (Hughes)

Japan Bonus Track
 "Imperfection (acoustic "love mix")" – 4:54 (Hughes)

Personnel
 Glenn Hughes – vocals, acoustic guitar, bass, electric guitar
 Chad Smith – drums, percussion
 Luis Carlos Maldonado – electric guitars, acoustic guitars
 JJ Marsh – electric guitar on track 9 + 10
 George Nastos – guitar on track 7 + 8
 Anders Olinder – keyboards
 Ed Roth  – keyboards on track 2 + 7, piano on track 4
 Ana Lenchantin – cello on track 6

References

External links
 

Glenn Hughes albums
2008 albums
Frontiers Records albums